Semantic Web - Interoperability, Usability, Applicability is a bimonthly peer-reviewed scientific journal published by IOS Press. It was established in 2010 and covers the foundations and applications of semantic web technologies and linked data. The journal uses an open peer-review process. The journal publishes its metadata online in the form of Linked Data and provides scientometrics such as the geographic distribution of authors, citation networks, trends in research topics over time, and so forth. The editors-in-chief are Pascal Hitzler (Kansas State University) and Krzysztof Janowicz (University of California, Santa Barbara).

The journal originally combined freely available author-versions of accepted papers with a subscription model and optional open access to published versions (green open access together with hybrid open access). In October 2019 the journal announced that it will go full (gold) open access and full open access was implemented 1 January 2020. Starting 29 April 2021, the journal implemented an Open Science Data policy that requires authors to publicly provide data and software relevant to their manuscript. 

The journal is abstracted and indexed by Science Citation Index Expanded and Scopus. According to the Journal Citation Reports, the journal has a 2019 impact factor of 3.524.

References

External links

Computer science journals
Publications established in 2010
English-language journals
Bimonthly journals
IOS Press academic journals
Open access journals